Würth-Preis für Europäische Literatur is a biennial German literary award given to an author. The prize is €25,000 and is open to any European authors. It is one of a series of awards given by the Würth Foundation (Stiftung Würth) in Künzelsau, a cultural organization supported by the Würth Group. The prize has been awarded since 1998, for "literary efforts for the cultural diversity of Europe".

Winners

1998 Hermann Lenz
2000 Claudio Magris
2002 Claude Vigée
2004 Harald Hartung
2006 Herta Müller
2008 Peter Turrini
2010 Ilija Trojanow
2012 Hanna Krall
2014 Péter Nádas
2016 Peter Handke
2018 Christoph Ransmayr
2020 David Grossman
2022 Annie Ernaux

References

External links
 

German literary awards